The French Royal Army was the principal land force of the Kingdom of France. It served the Bourbon dynasty from the reign of Louis XIV in the mid-17th century to that of Charles X in the 19th, with an interlude from 1792 to 1814 and another during the Hundred Days in 1815. It was permanently dissolved following the July Revolution in 1830. The French Royal Army became a model for the new regimental system that was to be imitated throughout Europe from the mid-17th century onward. It was regarded as Europe's greatest military force and  the most powerful armies in the world for much of its existence.

History

Army of Louis XIV

Creation of a professional royal army
When Louis XIV came to the French throne in 1661 he inherited a large but loosely organized force of about 70,000 men. Like the other European armies of the period, it consisted of a mixture of mercenaries, guard units, local militias and levies conscripted only for specific campaigns and then disbanded. Organization, cohesion, training and equipment were not of the highest standard.

Under Louis' two Secretaries of War Michel Le Tellier and his son the Marquis de Louvois, the French Royal Army was restructured into a highly disciplined and professional force made up of permanent regiments under central control. Weapons, promotion, drill, uniforms and organisation were improved or introduced and the army nearly doubled in size.

Military history of the reign
When Louis' father, Louis XIII, died, Anne of Austria, the queen, became regent.  She and her chief minister, Cardinal Mazarin, ordered the arrest of legislative opponents, causing the enmity of many nobles and common citizens.  When the bloody Thirty Years' War, in which France had sided with Protestant-governed countries against other Catholic nations in Europe, concluded, the Fronde civil war broke out and Mazarin was forced to flee.

When Louis XIV came of age in 1652, the Fronde ended and Mazarin was permitted to return and appointed chief minister for a second time. The leader of the anti-Mazarin faction, the Prince de Condé, escaped to Spain, which soon, with the Royalists of the British Isles, went to war against France and its new ally, Oliver Cromwell's Commonwealth of England. Under the command of Marshal Turenne, the Anglo-French army decisively defeated the Spanish in Flanders, part of which was a province of Spain.

In 1660, Louis married the Spanish princess Marie-Thérèse. In 1667 he claimed the Spanish Netherlands as her dowry, starting another conflict with Spain known as the War of Devolution. Turenne and Conde, who had been pardoned and allowed to return to France, commanded the French army. Their forces seized much of the Spanish Netherlands but, pressured by the Triple Alliance, Louis returned much of the French conquests in the Treaty of Aix-la-Chapelle, with the exception of eleven towns and their surrounding areas. Lille, Armentières, Bergues and Douai were considered essential to reinforce France's vulnerable northern border and remain French to this day. The retention of Tournai, Oudenarde, Courtrai, Veurne, Binche, Charleroi and Ath made future offensives much easier, as demonstrated in 1672.

From 1672 until 1678, France was embroiled in the Franco-Dutch War, with England and its navy as an ally (from 1672 to 1674). The war began in May 1672 when France invaded the Netherlands and nearly overran it, an event still referred to as het Rampjaar or 'Disaster Year'. By late July, the Dutch position had stabilised, with support from Emperor Leopold, Brandenburg-Prussia and Spain; this was formalised in the August 1673 Treaty of the Hague which Denmark joined in January 1674. But following English defeat and withdrawal, the French armies from 1674 to 1678, with Sweden as their only effective ally, managed to advance steadily in the southern (Spanish) Netherlands and along the Rhine, defeating the badly coordinated forces of the Grand Alliance with regularity. Eventually the heavy financial burdens of the war, along with the imminent prospect of England's reentry into the conflict on the side of the Dutch and their allies, convinced Louis to make peace despite his advantageous military position. The resulting Peace of Nijmegen between France and the Grand Alliance left the Dutch Republic intact and France generously aggrandized in the Spanish Netherlands.

The famed engineer Sébastien Le Prestre de Vauban designed his intricate fortifications during Louis XIV's reign. Vauban, a genius at siege warfare, oversaw the building or improvement of many fortresses in Flanders and elsewhere.

In 1688, the Catholic King of England, James II, was overthrown and William of Orange, a Dutch prince and old enemy of Louis, was installed as the next king. James fled to France, which he used as his base for an invasion of Ireland in 1690. As a result of James' ouster and, more directly, a French invasion of a German palatinate, the Nine Years' War broke out in 1689 and pitted France against the League of Augsburg and other European states.

The war ended with no major territorial gains or losses for either side, and the two alliances were at war again by 1701.  Despite initial French successes at Friedlingen and Hochstadt, the allied armies under the Duke of Marlborough and Prince Eugene of Savoy inflicted major defeats on French troops at Blenheim, Ramillies, and Oudenarde. In Spain (the succession to that nation's throne was the war's cause), Spanish forces allied to the French lost Gibraltar. However, the heavy casualties suffered at Malplaquet in 1709 provided an opening for Marlborough's political opponents and after their victory in the 1710 British general election, he was removed from command and Britain sought to end the war. France's fortune returned under the leadership of Marshal Villars and Marshal Vendôme but despite a major victory at Denain in 1712, the war had turned into a stalemate and ended in a treaty that somewhat favored the French in 1714.

Louis XV's reign

Louis XV, the great-grandson of Louis XIV, was the only direct heir alive when the elderly king died in 1715. His reign was much more peaceful than his great-grandfather's, although three major wars occurred. First was the War of the Polish Succession of 1733. The second, the War of the Austrian Succession, began when Maria Theresa was crowned Holy Roman Empress in 1740. Her father had appointed her as his heir, and other European countries agreed to respect his wishes. However, the new Prussian king, Frederick II, ignored the agreement, known as the Pragmatic Sanction, and annexed Habsburg-held lands within the Empire.

Britain allied itself with Maria Theresa, while Louis XV forged an alliance with Frederick. Louis provided military support in the form of detachments from France's Irish Brigade, in support of Charles Edward Stuart during the Jacobite rising of 1745. The Pragmatic Allies initially defeated the French in the Battle of Dettingen in 1743 but the battle had little effect on the wider war and has been described as "a happy escape, rather than a great victory". A series of French victories (including Marshal de Saxe's great triumph at Fontenoy in 1745) made the French conquest of much of the Austrian Netherlands possible; however, this territory was returned to Austria at the end of the war.

The situation after the war was almost the same as before, but it set the stage for the Seven Years' War, which officially began in 1756, when Prussia and Austria again went to war. This time, however, France and Austria were allied and Britain and Prussia formed an alliance. French forces were defeated at the Battle of Rossbach in 1757. At the same time as the fighting in Europe, raiding parties composed of French-Canadian militiamen and Indians attacked English settlements in North America. This war, known as the French and Indian War, was the last of four wars that occurred in North America at the same time as a European conflict. However, by 1759, the British had gone onto the offensive in America and captured Quebec, the French colonial capital.

Fighting also occurred on the Indian subcontinent during Louis XV's reign. During the War of the Austrian Succession, French troops captured several settlements in India, but its allies were defeated by British troops in 1756. On the whole, the Seven Years' War went badly for the French, who were forced to sign an unfavorable treaty in 1763.

Collapse of the royal army

When Britain's North American colonies rebelled in 1775, France initially offered limited support. However, after the American victory in the Battle of Saratoga, Louis XVI of France authorized an expeditionary force under the Count de Rochambeau to sail to America and aid the revolutionaries. The expeditionary force participated in the Battle of Yorktown in 1781, which resulted in the colonies' independence. In 1784, Jean-François Coste was appointed Chief Consulting Physician of the Camps and Armies of the King.

By the 1780s, the political balance in France had shifted. The aristocracy had become despised by many lower-and-middle-class citizens who faced famine in the winter of 1788/89 and almost no political freedom. At an earlier stage in his reign Louis had succumbed to pressure from the nobility and banned promotion to officer status from the lower ranks of the Royal Army. This measure served to embitter long serving non-commissioned officers who could no longer aspire to reach commissioned rank, although the demands of regimental discipline and training still fell heavily upon them. Some of the now almost entirely aristocratic officer corps were still dedicated professionals but many neglected their responsibilities, preferring to spend excessive periods of leave as courtiers at Versailles or on their country estates.

Many French soldiers sympathized with the masses from which they were drawn, and increasing numbers deserted in 1789. The bulk of the rank and file of the Gardes Françaises: the largest regiment of the maison militaire du roi de France and the permanent garrison of Paris, refused to obey their officers at a crucial point in the early stages of the Revolution.  Some Gardes joined with the Parisian mob on 14 July 1789 and participated in the storming of the Bastille, the medieval fortress-prison thought of as a symbol of governmental repression.

King Louis' powers were regulated by the National Assembly, which also authorized the creation of the National Guard, which was intended to be used as a counterweight to the royal army. The regular army was weakened by the flight of many aristocratic officers. Faced with the creation of soldiers' clubs (Jacobin committees), erosion of discipline, loss of their privileges as nobles and political mistrust, perhaps two thirds of the commissioned ranks emigrated after June 1791. They were largely replaced by experienced non-commissioned officers. In July 1791, twelve foreign regiments of mostly German mercenaries were amalgamated into the line, followed by the disbanding of the Swiss regiments a year later.

Major reorganizations of the army took place in 1791 and 1792. New officers were elected and the structure of the army was changed. Battalions of volunteers were authorized and subsequently merged with surviving units of the former royal army, to form amalgamated demi-brigades. This force underwent its first test during the Battle of Valmy in 1792, when an Austro-Prussian army invaded to restore the King's full powers. By now, the army was considered to be loyal to the First Republic, not to the king. From then until 1804, the army was known as the French Revolutionary Army, and from 1804 to 1814, the Grande Armée (Great Army), and during the Hundred Days in 1815, was reconstituted before being officially disbanded.

First Bourbon restoration

Louis XVI was guillotined in 1793. By 1800, the First Republic, at war with much of Europe, had adopted a weak form of government that was overthrown by General Napoleon Bonaparte, who later proclaimed himself Emperor of the French. When Austrian, British, Prussian, and Russian armies invaded France in 1814, Napoleon was forced to abdicate. Louis XVI's brother, the Count of Provence, was declared King Louis XVIII.  Under Louis XVIII, no major changes were made to the army, beyond the recreation of several regiments of the pre-revolutionary maison militaire du roi. However, when Napoleon returned from exile in 1815, the army, for the most part, went over to his side, and Louis fled.

Second Bourbon restoration and July Revolution
Napoleon was defeated by a combined Allied army in 1815 at Waterloo, and Louis XVIII was returned to the throne. Realizing that the remains of the existing army had no loyalty to the restored monarchy, the government of Louis XVIII undertook a wholesale disbandment of what had been Napoleon's regiments. In their place a system of Departmental Legions was created with no historic connections to empire, republic or even the pre-1792 monarchy. His government appointed many aristocratic officers to the new army, which lost much of its morale, much as it had in 1789. In 1823, a French expeditionary force aided Spanish troops loyal to the Bourbon king of that country when his regime was threatened by an uprising.

In 1830, King Charles X, was forced to abdicate in the July Revolution. The army participated in little fighting, and the king's cousin, the Duke of Orléans was installed as Louis-Philippe I in what was supposed to be a constitutional monarchy. The army transferred its allegiance to Louis-Philippe's House of Orléans until his overthrow in 1848, when the short-lived Second Republic was established.

Conflicts

Franco-Spanish War (1652–1659)
War of Devolution (1667–1668)
Franco-Dutch War (1672–1678)
War of the Reunions (1683–1684)
Nine Years' War (1689–1697)
War of the Spanish Succession (1701–1714)
War of the Polish Succession (1733–1738)
War of the Austrian Succession (1740–1748)
Seven Years' War (1756–1763)
American Revolutionary War (1779–1783)
French Revolutionary Wars (1792)
French invasion of Spain (1823)

Notable battles

Franco-Spanish War 
Battle of Arras (1654)
Battle of Valenciennes (1656)
Battle of the Dunes (1658)

Franco-Dutch War
Siege of Maastricht (1673)
Battle of Seneffe (1674)
Battle of Sinsheim (1674)
Battle of Entzheim (1674)
Battle of Mulhouse (1674)
Battle of Turckheim (1675)
Battle of Konzer Brücke (1675)
Siege of Philippsburg (1676)
Siege of Maastricht (1676)
Siege of Valenciennes (1677)
Siege of Cambrai (1677)
Battle of Cassel (1677)
Battle of Ortenbach (1678)
Battle of Saint-Denis (1678)

Nine Years' War
Siege of Philippsburg (1688)
Battle of Walcourt (1689)
Battle of Fleurus (1690)
Battle of Staffarda (1690)
Siege of Mons (1691)
Siege of Cuneo (1691)
Battle of Leuze (1691)
Siege of Namur (1692)
Battle of Steenkerque (1692)
Battle of Landen (1693)
Battle of Marsaglia (1693)
Battle of Torroella (1694)
Battle of Sant Esteve d'en Bas (1695)
Siege of Namur (1695)
Siege of Diksmuide (1695)
Siege of Ath (1697)
Siege of Barcelona (1697)

War of the Spanish Succession
Battle of Chiari (1701)
Battle of Luzzara (1702)
Battle of Friedlingen (1702)
First Battle of Höchstädt (1703)
Battle of Speyerbach (1703)
Battle of Blenheim (1704)
Battle of Elixheim (1705)
Battle of Cassano (1705)
Battle of Calcinato (1706)
Battle of Ramillies (1706)
Battle of Turin (1706)
Battle of Castiglione (1706)
Battle of Almansa (1707)
Siege of Toulon (1707)
Battle of Oudenarde (1708)
Battle of Wijnendale (1708)
Siege of Lille (1708)
Battle of Malplaquet (1709)
Battle of Saragossa (1710)
Battle of Villaviciosa (1710)
Battle of Brihuega (1710)
Siege of Bouchain (1711)
Battle of Denain (1712)
Siege of Bouchain (1712)
Rhine campaign (1713)
Siege of Barcelona (1713-1714)

War of the Polish Succession
Siege of Danzig (1734)
Battle of Guastalla (1734)

War of the Austrian Succession
Battle of Dettingen (1740)
Battle of Fontenoy (1745)

Seven Years' War/French and Indian War
Battle of the Monongahela (1756)
Battle of Ticonderoga (1758)
Battle of Minden (1759)
Battle of Quebec (1759)

Anglo-French War/American Revolutionary War
Siege of Savannah (1779)
Battle of Martinique (1780) – several regiments acting as marines aboard ships
Siege of Yorktown (1781)
Hudson Bay Expedition (1782)
Battle of the Saintes (1782) – several regiments acting as marines aboard ships

French Revolution/French Revolutionary Wars
Battle of Valmy (1792) during transition to Army of the First Republic

French invasion of Spain
Battle of Trocadero (1823)

Notable personnel
Henri de La Tour d'Auvergne, vicomte de Turenne
Louis II de Bourbon, Prince de Condé
François Henri de Montmorency, Duke of Luxembourg
Sébastien Vauban
Claude de Villars
Louis Joseph, Duke of Vendôme
Maurice de Saxe
Nicolas Catinat
James FitzJames, 1st Duke of Berwick
Jean-de-Dieu Soult
Nicolas Oudinot
Gilbert du Motier, Marquis de Lafayette
Jean-Baptiste Donatien de Vimeur, comte de Rochambeau
Camille d'Hostun, Duke of Tallard
Victor-François de Broglie, Duke of Broglie
Louis de Buade de Frontenac
François de Neufville, Duke of Villeroi
Louis Antoine, Duke of Angoulême

Organisation 
Before the French Revolution:

 List of legions of the French Royal Army (pre 1792)
 List of infantry regiments of the French Royal Army (pre 1792)
List of Royal French Army regiments in 1776
 List of Royal French foreign regiments

Following the First and Second Reformations:

 List of cavalry regiments of the French Royal Army (post 1815)
 List of legions of the French Royal Army (post 1815)
 List of infantry regiments of the French Royal Army (post 1815)
 List of artillery regiments of the French Royal Army (post 1815)

Uniforms

The guard regiments of the Maison du Roi adopted complete uniforms in the early 1660s as a substitute for the cassocks with civilian clothing worn previously. As an example the Garden Francais were reported as wearing grey and red uniforms with silver embroidery shortly after 1661. The line infantry adopted clothing in various regimental colours decided on by their colonels, in an extended process starting in the early 1660s but not completed until the late 1670s. Cavalry wore buff leather coats and breeches without specific uniform features until "grey cloth lined in the same colour" and dark blue for royal mounted units was ordered in November 1671.

During the 1680s there was a movement towards more standardised dress, although dragoons and foreign infantry still wore coats in a wide range of regimental colours  The guards regiments wore blue, the regular infantry wore gray-white, and the Swiss mercenary regiments in French service wore red. In 1690, during the Nine Years' War, each regiment was given a uniform.  Eighty-eight regiments wore gray uniforms with red facings, and fourteen princely regiments wore blue. The first regulations detailing specifics of uniforms is dated to 1704. Unusually, grenadiers for most of the part wore a tricorn like the fusiliers, rather than a mitre or a bearskin. Bearskins came into full use by about 1770.

During the 18th century a series of revised dress regulations made for repeated changes in the facing colours of individual infantry regiments. The Swiss and Irish mercenary regiments retained their red coats throughout this period, while other foreign units generally wore medium blue. Cavalry wore a variety of green, blue or red regimental uniforms, largely according to the whim of individual colonels. The regiments of the Royal Household were similarly variegated, although dark blue dominated. The change from the white or off-white uniforms, traditionally associated with the line infantry of the royal army, to dark blue was completed in 1793 after the overthrow of the monarchy. White uniforms were restored after the Bourbon Restoration, although modified for a more modern appearance, introducing trousers rather than breeches, taller shakos, and Fleur-de-lis insignia. Dark blue coatees were adopted in 1819.

In 1829/30, red trousers and breeches were adopted for most infantry and cavalry regiments. These pantalons rouge were to remain as an iconic symbol of the French Army until the early months of World War I, and survive in a limited number of modern ceremonial uniforms.

Weaponry
Like most other late-seventeenth and eighteenth-century armies, the French Royal Army was equipped primarily with muskets. However, fusils became standard firearms. Pikes were used by French forces early on during the reign of Louis XIV.

Recruitment
Voluntary enlistment for periods of six to eight years, through regimental recruiting parties, was the French Royal Army's standard method.  However, periods of service might be compulsorily extended if individual units fell below strength. Conscription generally applied only to levies in war-time for part-time militia.

Recruitment was in part undertaken on a provincial basis, although up to half of the rank and file of a given regiment might be drawn from outside the designated regional area.

Employment of Swiss mercenaries

During the 17th and 18th centuries twelve regiments of Swiss mercenaries were employed in the French Royal Army, notably the Swiss Guards. During the 10 August riot of 1792, supporters of the French Revolution, including members of the radical-leaning National Guard marched on the Tuileries Palace. King Louis XVI escaped with his family, but, after fighting broke out in the palace courtyard, the Swiss Guards were massacred by the mob. Some Guards, including the commander, were captured, jailed, and later guillotined.

See also
List of Royal French foreign regiments
Social background of officers and other ranks in the French Army, 1750–1815

References

Military history of France
House of Bourbon
Military history of the Ancien Régime